Sir James May, 1st Baronet (6 November 1723 – 8 November 1811) was an Anglo-Irish politician. 

May was the son of James May and Letitia Ponsonby, daughter of William Ponsonby, 1st Viscount Duncannon. He was the Member of Parliament for Waterford County between 1759 and 1797. On 30 June 1763 he was created a baronet, of Mayfield in the Baronetage of Ireland; he was succeeded in his title by his son, Edward May.

References

1723 births
1811 deaths
18th-century Anglo-Irish people
19th-century Anglo-Irish people
Baronets in the Baronetage of Ireland
Irish MPs 1727–1760
Irish MPs 1761–1768
Irish MPs 1769–1776
Irish MPs 1776–1783
Irish MPs 1783–1790
Irish MPs 1790–1797
Members of the Parliament of Ireland (pre-1801) for County Waterford constituencies